Masterboy is a German Eurodance project best known in Europe for the hits "Feel the Heat of the Night", "Anybody", "I Got to Give It Up", "Generation of Love", "Everybody Needs Somebody" and "Is This the Love".

In 2013, after 10 years since their break up, the "Golden Trio" (Trixi Delgado, Tommy Schleh and Enrico Zabler) of Masterboy came back to perform at different '90s revival shows, with former vocalist Linda Rocco joining them occasionally. A new single was released in 2017.

Discography

Studio albums

Singles

References

External links
 Official website
 
 Old official fansite

Musical groups established in 1990
German electronic music groups
German dance music groups
German Eurodance groups
1990 establishments in Germany
Polydor Records artists